North State Public Radio (KCHO 91.7 Chico/KFPR 88.9 Redding) is an NPR-affiliated public radio broadcaster which has main stations in the Northern California cities of Redding and Chico. It airs news and public affairs, classical music, talk radio and jazz programs. With the help of a number of relay transmitters, NSPR's signal covers a large portion of the North State region, including the cities of Red Bluff, Oroville, Paradise, Anderson, and Shasta Lake City.

In 2020, Capital Public Radio, which operates KXJZ and KXPR, took over day to day operations of the station under a public service operating agreement.

Programming
Programming produced by North State Public Radio includes gardening show Cultivating Place and science show Blue Dot.

Stations

Translators
In addition to the main stations, KCHO and KFPR are relayed by additional translators to widen their broadcast area.

References

External links

College radio stations in California
Radio stations in Chico, California
NPR member networks
California State University, Chico
Redding, California
Butte County, California
Shasta County, California